The 1971 Sabah state election were to be held in October 1971, after the State Assembly was dissolved on 20 September 1971. This was the second state election to take place.

After nominations closed on 5 October 1971, Sabah Alliance which consists of United Sabah National Organisation (USNO) and Sabah Chinese Association (SCA), won all the seats uncontested. All the opposition nomination papers were rejected, or no nominations were sent at all.

Results

Aftermath
Mustapha Harun, the leader of USNO & Sabah Alliance, and the Chief Minister before the election, were sworn in as Chief Minister for the second term, on 7 October.

References

Sabah state elections
Sabah
Uncontested elections